Monterde de Albarracín is a municipality in the province of Teruel, Aragon, Spain. According to the 2010 census the municipality had a population of 69 inhabitants. Its postal code is 44368. It has an area of 45.12 km2. There is a church from the sixteenth century in Monterde de Albarracín.

The town is located in the mountains of the Iberian System.

See also
Sierra de Albarracín Comarca
List of municipalities in Teruel

References

External links

Monterde de Albarracín site

Municipalities in the Province of Teruel